DXNT (96.5 FM) is a radio station owned and operated by Kaissar Broadcasting Network. Its studios and transmitter are located at 2nd Floor, Charm Bldg., JP Quijano St. cor. Pastrano St., Brgy. Poblacion, Oroquieta.

References

External links
DXNT FB Page

Radio stations in Misamis Occidental
Radio stations established in 2012